The Window of the World Monorail is a monorail that transports passengers around the Window of the World, which is a theme park located in Shenzhen, Guangdong, China. It runs three-car trains carrying 18 passengers.  Built by Intamin, the line's success led to the city of Shenzhen building its own, larger version, the Happy Line.

References 

Transport in Shenzhen
Monorails
Monorails in China
People Porter people movers
Railway lines opened in 1993
Amusement rides manufactured by Intamin